Don Antonio de Benavides y Fernández de Navarrete (20 June 1807, in Baeza, Spain – 23 January 1884, in Madrid, Spain) was a Spanish noble, historian and politician who served as Minister of State between 1864 and 1865, in the reign of Queen Isabella II of Spain.

Benavides was the eldest son of Manuel de Benavides y Rodríguez-Zambrano, Major of the Hermandad for the noble state in 1808, and his wife Francisca de Paula Fernández de Navarrete y Motilla. Among other honors, he was Knight of Santiago and Knight Grand Cross of the Order of Isabella the Catholic.

Sources
Cadenas y Vicent, Vicente de, Knights of the Order of Santiago in the 19th Century. Madrid, Hidalguía, 1992. 
Antonio de Benavides. Geneall.net
Personal dossier of D. Antonio de Benavide y Fernández de Navarrete. Spanish Senate

|-

Foreign ministers of Spain
Knights of Santiago
Knights Grand Cross of the Order of Isabella the Catholic
1807 births
1884 deaths
Moderate Party (Spain) politicians
19th-century Spanish politicians